The 2012 United States House of Representatives elections in Wisconsin were held on Tuesday, November 6, 2012, to elect the eight U.S. representatives from Wisconsin, one from each of the state's eight congressional districts. Representatives are elected for two-year terms; those elected will serve in the 112th Congress from January 2013 until January 2015. The elections coincided with the elections of other federal and state offices, including a quadrennial presidential election and an election to the U.S. Senate. Primary elections were held on August 14, 2012.

Overview

District 1
Republican Paul Ryan, who has represented Wisconsin's 1st congressional district since 1999, ran for reelection after deciding not to run for the U.S. Senate or seek the Republican presidential nomination in 2012.

Though Ryan was selected to be the Republican nominee for Vice President of the United States on August 11, 2012, he was allowed, and continued to, run for re-election to his House seat.

Rob Zerban, a member of the Kenosha County Board and former small business owner, sought and received the Democratic nomination to challenge Ryan.

Keith Deschler, a factory worker, ran as a Libertarian.

General election results

 

External links
Paul Ryan
 Paul Ryan campaign website
Rob Zerban
 Rob Zerban campaign website

District 2
Democrat Tammy Baldwin, who represented Wisconsin's 2nd congressional district since 1999, ran for the U.S. Senate. State Representative Mark Pocan sought and received the Democratic nomination to succeed Baldwin. He defeated Dennis Hall, a former member of the Janesville City Council; state Representative Kelda Roys; and Matt Silverman, an attorney and decorated combat veteran, in the Democratic primary. Dane County Treasurer Dave Worzala had also been seeking the Democratic nomination, but dropped out of the race in May 2012. State Senator Jon Erpenbach, who had been considering a bid, chose not to run. 

Chad Lee, a businessman who unsuccessfully challenged Baldwin as the Republican nominee in 2010, chose to run again.
Primary results

General election results

 

External links
Chad Lee campaign website
Mark Pocan campaign website

District 3
Democrat Ron Kind, who has represented Wisconsin's 3rd congressional district since 1997, did not run for the U.S. Senate and instead ran for re-election.

Ray Boland, a former state Secretary of Veterans Affairs and former commander at Fort McCoy, sought and received the Republican nomination to challenge Kind.

General election results

 

External links
Ray Boland campaign website
Ron Kind campaign website

District 4
Democrat Gwen Moore, who has represented Wisconsin's 4th congressional district since 2005, is running for re-election.

Dan Sebring, an automobile repair shop owner who unsuccessfully challenged Moore as the Republican nominee in 2010, ran again.

Robert R. Raymond, a perennial candidate, ran as an Independent.

General election results

External links
Gwen Moore campaign website
Dan Sebring campaign website

District 5
Republican Jim Sensenbrenner, who has represented Wisconsin's 5th congressional district since 2003 (and previously represented Wisconsin's 9th congressional district from 1979 to 2003), is running for re-election.

Dave Heaster, a technology employee at the Kohler Company, sought and received the Democratic nomination to challenge Sensenbrenner.

General election results

 

External links
Dave Heaster campaign website
Jim Sensenbrenner campaign website

District 6
Republican Tom Petri, who has represented Wisconsin's 6th congressional district since 1979, is running for re-election. Lauren Stephens, the founder of a conservative political action committee, unsuccessfully challenged Petri in the Republican primary.

Joe Kallas, a former member of the Green Lake County Board who unsuccessfully challenged Petri as the Democratic nominee in 2010, is running again.
Primary results

General election results

 

External links
Joe Kallas campaign website
Tom Petri campaign website

District 7
Republican Sean Duffy, who has represented Wisconsin's 7th congressional district since 2011, is running for re-election. 

Former state Senator Pat Kreitlow sought and received the Democratic nomination to challenge Duffy. State Representative Janet Bewley chose not to run.

General election results

External links
 Sean Duffy campaign website
 Pat Kreitlow campaign website

District 8
Republican Reid Ribble, who has represented Wisconsin's 8th congressional district since 2011, is running for re-election. 

Jamie Wall, a business consultant and unsuccessful primary candidate for the 8th district in 2006, sought and received the Democratic nomination to challenge Ribble.

General election results

External links
Reid Ribble
 Reid Ribble campaign website
Jamie Wall
 Jamie Wall campaign website

References

External links
Elections & Voting at the Wisconsin Government Accountability Board
Candidate list
United States House of Representatives elections in Wisconsin, 2012 at Ballotpedia
Wisconsin U.S. House at OurCampaigns.com
Campaign contributions for U.S. Congressional races in Wisconsin at OpenSecrets
Outside spending at the Sunlight Foundation

House
2012
Wisconsin